Ravenshoe is a rural town and locality in the Tablelands Region, Queensland, Australia.

Geography 
Ravenshoe is on the Atherton Tableland in Far North Queensland.

It also has the Millstream Falls, the widest waterfall in Australia. Traditionally the main industry in Ravenshoe was timber, but since 1987, when the government made  of surrounding rainforest world heritage listed, the main industries have been tourism, beef and dairy farming.

History

The traditional owners of the land in the Ravenshoe district are the Jirrbal people who speak a dialect of the Dyirbal language.

The site of the present day Ravenshoe was first settled by pastoralists prior to 1881 but when stands of red cedar (Toona ciliata) trees were found at nearby Cedar Creek, the mining entrepreneur, John Moffat purchased the pastoral properties in 1897. A village called Cedar Creek was established. By 1910, the nearby mining town of Herberton has been connected by railway to Cairns and Cedar Creek had been renamed Ravenshoe. The name is supposed to have been chosen because a copy of Henry Kingsley's novel Ravenshoe was found discarded nearby.

Ravenshoe State School opened on 5 February 1912. It expanded to offer secondary schooling on 3 February 1958.

By 1912, Ravenshoe had a store, a school, the Club Hotel and a population of 1,000 people. The timber industry was by now supplying Queensland maple (Flindersia brayleyana), oak (Argyrodendron peralatum) and black walnut (Endiandra globosa).

Geraldton Road State School opened on 1916. It closed on 1960.

Chilverton State School opened on 31 July 1916. It closed on 1 July 1956.

On 11 December 1916 Ravenshoe was finally connected with Cairns by the Tablelands railway line.

Horse Shoe Bend State School opened in 1917. It closed in 1925 due to low student numbers. The school reopened in 1929 and closed in 1952.

Vine Creek State School opened on 10 September 1936. It closed on 16 August 1945. The school was at 620 Tully Falls Road.

Roads connected Ravenshoe with Atherton and Innisfail by 1936 and by 1949 there were three sawmills, two hotels, two cinemas, a guest house and two churches.

In World War II as part of the Atherton Project, tent encampments were established by the Australian Army (6th and 7th Divisions) near Ravenshoe, Wondecla and Wongabel.

The Ravenshoe Parish of the Roman Catholic Diocese of Cairns was established in 1949.

St Teresa's Catholic School was established in 1950 by the Sisters of Mercy. The single-room school building was the former Catholic Church at Irvinebank which was relocated to Ravenshoe. On opening there were 60 children enrolled from Years 1 through 7. In 1978 the Sisters of Mercy ended their role in the school, being replaced by lay teachers.

St Barnabas' School was established in 1953 by the Bush Brotherhood of St Barnabas. Reginald Halse, Anglican Archbishop of Brisbane unveiled a plaque on 27 September 1952 to mark the site of the new school, a  block of land in anticipation of the school offering agricultural subjects. It closed on 31 October 1990. In 1992, the Queensland Education Department purchased St Barnabas' to establish a separate secondary campus for Ravenshoe State School.

Tully Falls State School opened on 9 August 1953. It closed on 31 December 1955.

The railway service from Atherton to Ravenshoe closed in 1988, following the designation of the Wet Tropics of Queensland as a UNESCO World Heritage Site.

The Ravenshoe Library opened in 1992 and had a major refurbishment in 2017.

This figure refers to the immediate township area only. The locality has a population of 1,442.

2015 cafe explosion 

Ravenshoe became national news after a vehicle ran into a gas cylinder at the Grigg Street 'Serves You Right Cafe' on 9 June 2015. In the resulting explosion and fire 20 people were hospitalised, 8 critically injured. Two people, the manager of the cafe and an 82-year-old Silver Valley resident, later died from their burns.  there were still 7 people listed as critical with burn injuries. Five of them were females aged 43, 51, 59 and 75, and three males aged 56, 59 and 69. All were treated in Brisbane, while the driver of the vehicle that caused the explosion, with a broken spine and burns, was also listed as critical and treated in Cairns.

Attractions

Natural attractions
Ravenshoe is located close to waterfalls, crater lakes, swamps, water holes, rainforests and historical landmarks. There is also a diverse variety of plants and animals, including 12 species of possum, 8 species of kangaroo and abundant bird life. In 2005, Malaan National Park was declared over forests which were previously known as Dirran State Forest.

Bushwalking
Misty Mountain Wilderness trails are a network of extensive walking tracks that traverse Tully Gorge National Park and Wooroonooran National Park. There are bushwalks to the Millstream Falls as well as Little Millstream Falls.

Steam railway
From time to time, a steam train runs between Ravenshoe and the nearby town of Tumoulin, carrying locals and tourists to and from the local markets.

Other attractions

Ravenshoe has a number of galleries and creative industries, reflecting the nature of the locals. The Windy Hill Wind Farm owned by Queensland Government's Transfield Services Infrastructure Fund (together with the Koombooloomba hydroelectric dam) generates enough electricity to power several towns.

Amenities
Ravenshoe has a butcher, bakery, an IGA supermarket, Cornetts Supermarket, two cafes, several craft shops, a Vinnies op-shop, a post office, a medical centre, a newsagency, a chemist, a Home hardware store, two pubs, two tyre shops, two salons, four fuel outlets, two caravan parks, a laundromat, Bendigo Bank and National Australia Bank branches, two real estate agencies and three schools and a community kindergarten.

The Ravenshoe Millstream Country Club has a 9-hole golf course which is claimed to be the highest golf club in Queensland. Camping and caravan accommodation are available on site, for casual golfers.

The Tablelands Regional Council operate a public library at 24 Moore Street.

The Ravenshoe branch of the Queensland Country Women's Association meets at 15 Herbert Street.

St Teresa of the Child Jesus Catholic Church is at 2 Moffatt Street. It is within the Ravenshoe Parish of the Roman Catholic Diocese of Cairns which is administered from the Malanda Parish.

Education
Ravenshoe State School is a government primary and secondary (Prep-12) school for boys and girls. In 2017, the school had an enrolment of 420 students with 46 teachers (41 full-time equivalent) and 34 non-teaching staff (23 full-time equivalent). The school has two campuses; a primary (Prep-6) campus at Ascham Street and a secondary (7–12) campus at Moore Street. It includes a special education program operating at the Moore Street campus.

St Teresa's School is a Catholic primary (Prep-6) school for boys and girls at 6 Moffatt Street. In 2017, the school had an enrolment of 103 students with 12 teachers (9 full-time equivalent) and 10 non-teaching staff (5 full-time equivalent).

References

External links

 
 Town map of Ravenshoe, 1972
Tablelands site
Visitors Centre

Towns in Queensland
Populated places in Far North Queensland
Tablelands Region
Localities in Queensland